S. R. Srinivas is an Indian politician from the state of Karnataka. He is a four term member of the Karnataka Legislative Assembly and has remained undefeated in all the 5 elections he has faced in his lifetime, including his initial Zilla Panchayath election in 2000. He is also the only MLA in the country to have received the prestigious Bravery Award from the President of India for saving the life of a child.

Constituency
He represents the Gubbi constituency.

Political Party  
He is from the Janata Dal (Secular).

References 

Living people
Karnataka MLAs 2008–2013
1962 births